Adrian Harrington (born 1948, Chelsea, England) is a notable antiquarian bookseller, a Past President of the Antiquarian Booksellers Association (ABA), 2001–2003, and a recent Past President of the International League of Antiquarian Booksellers (ILAB). He has exhibited at major international book fairs in America, Canada, Hong Kong, Britain and Ireland, and between 2000 and 2010 Harrington was the chairman of Britain's leading rare book event, the summer ABA Book Fair at Olympia, London. During his tenure, it was host to opening speakers including authors Jacqueline Wilson, Lynda La Plante, Joanna Lumley, Bob Geldof, Jeremy Paxman, Andrew Marr, Barry Humphries, Frederick Forsyth and former Poet Laureate Sir Andrew Motion. 
Harrington has been a regular consultant on rare books for Millers Price Guide, and has been interviewed on book-related matters by the BBC, and Australian Television

History

Adrian Harrington was established in the King's Road, Chelsea in 1971, moving to a location in Kensington Church Street in 1997. In 2014, he acquired the historic Hall's Bookshop in Tunbridge Wells and relocated to their premises. He deals in English Literature, first editions and general antiquarian books, and specialises in authors Winston Churchill, Arthur Conan Doyle, Graham Greene, J.K.Rowling and, particularly, Ian Fleming. Harrington's shop is managed by his son-in-law, the bibliographer and James Bond archivist Jon Gilbert, who is a member of the Ian Fleming Foundation (IFF), and during the late 1990s and 2000s Adrian Harrington held several book signing events for James Bond novelist Raymond Benson, attended by Ian Fleming's literary agent Peter Janson-Smith, the former Chairman of Glidrose Publications. Also attending were Doug Redenius, President of the Ian Fleming Foundation, and IFF directors David A.Reinhart and Dave Worrall, and biographer of Ian Fleming Andrew Lycett. 
The Adrian Harrington bookshop has also been used to film the 2005 literary-based comedy drama Mrs. Palfrey at the Claremont, starring Joan Plowright and Rupert Friend. In recent years Adrian Harrington has been a stockist and distributor for Queen Anne Press publications.

References

External links 
 Website of the Antiquarian Booksellers Association
 Website of the International League of Antiquarian Booksellers
 Website of the Olympia Bookfair
 Ian Fleming Publications Official Website
 Queen Anne Press

British booksellers
Antiquarian booksellers
Bookshops in London
Living people
1948 births